Clube de Natação Hoi Fan (Traditional Chinese: 海帆, literally meaning sail of the sea) is a Macau football club, which plays in the town of Macau. They play in the Macau's first division, the Campeonato da 1ª Divisão do Futebol.

History
Having been relegated after the 2006 season, they immediately gained promotion back to the 1ª Divisão in 2007 finishing runners-up of the 2ª Divisão. They started the 2008 season by holding defending Champions GD Lam Pak to a 1–1 draw.

Current squad

Honours 
Taça de Macau em Futebol
Winners (1): 2008

Sources 

Football clubs in Macau